The Josep Pla Award is a Spanish literary prize, awarded by the Destino publishing house since 1968, to a prose text written in Catalan. It is open to all genres: novel, short story, narrative, travel book, memoir, biography, diary, etc. Its name pays tribute to Josep Pla, considered one of the most important prose writers of contemporary Catalan literature.

It is one of the most prestigious prizes awarded to literature in Catalan. The Premio Nadal is also awarded at the same ceremony.

Winners

References

External links
 
 

1968 establishments in Spain
Awards established in 1968
Catalan literary awards